Albert Neumann (19 October 1899 – 1 March 1976) was a Luxembourgian gymnast. He competed at the 1924 Summer Olympics and the 1928 Summer Olympics.

References

External links
 

1899 births
1976 deaths
Luxembourgian male artistic gymnasts
Olympic gymnasts of Luxembourg
Gymnasts at the 1924 Summer Olympics
Gymnasts at the 1928 Summer Olympics
People from Troisvierges
20th-century Luxembourgian people